"The Lake Isle of Innisfree" is a twelve-line poem comprising three quatrains, written by William Butler Yeats in 1888 and first published in the National Observer in 1890. It was reprinted in The Countess Kathleen and Various Legends and Lyrics in 1892 and as an illustrated Cuala Press Broadside in 1932.

"The Lake Isle of Innisfree" exemplifies the style of the Celtic Revival: it is an attempt to create a form of poetry that was Irish in origin rather than one that adhered to the standards set by English poets and critics. It received critical acclaim in the United Kingdom and France. The poem is featured in Irish passports.

Background
Lake Isle of Innisfree is an uninhabited island within Lough Gill, in Ireland, near which Yeats spent his summers as a child. Yeats describes the inspiration for the poem coming from a "sudden" memory of his childhood while walking down Fleet Street in London in 1888. He writes, "I had still the ambition, formed in Sligo in my teens, of living in imitation of Thoreau on Innisfree, a little island in Lough Gill, and when walking through Fleet Street very homesick I heard a little tinkle of water and saw a fountain in a shop-window which balanced a little ball upon its jet, and began to remember lake water. From the sudden remembrance came my poem "Innisfree," my first lyric with anything in its rhythm of my own music. I had begun to loosen rhythm as an escape from rhetoric and from that emotion of the crowd that rhetoric brings, but I only understood vaguely and occasionally that I must for my special purpose use nothing but the common syntax. A couple of years later I could not have written that first line with its conventional archaism—"Arise and go"—nor the inversion of the last stanza."

Analysis
The twelve-line poem is divided into three quatrains and is an example of Yeats's earlier lyric poems. The poem expresses the speaker's longing for the peace and tranquility of Innisfree while residing in an urban setting.  He can escape the noise of the city and be lulled by the "lake water lapping with low sounds by the shore." On this small island, he can return to nature by growing beans and having bee hives, by enjoying the "purple glow" of heather at noon, the sounds of birds' wings, and, of course, the bees.  He can even build a cabin and stay on the island much as Thoreau, the American Transcendentalist, lived at Walden Pond.  During Yeats's lifetime it was—to his annoyance—one of his most popular poems, and on one occasion was recited (or sung) in his honor by two (or ten—accounts vary) thousand Boy Scouts. The first quatrain speaks to the needs of the body (food and shelter); the second to the needs of the spirit (peace); the final quatrain is the meeting of the inner life (memory) with the physical world (pavement grey).

Musical settings
Muriel Herbert set the poem in 1928.
Seattle, WA band Fleet Foxes mentions the Isles of Innisfree in many other songs including "The Shrine/An Argument", "Isles" and "Bedouin Dress".
American composer Ben Moore has also composed a setting of the poem.
Another musical setting is featured in Branduardi canta Yeats (published by Edizioni Musicali Musiza, 1986), composed and played by Angelo Branduardi on translation of Luisa Zappa.
Michael McGlynn of the Irish group Anúna arranged this as a choral piece: a recording of it is featured on Anúna's album Invocation.
Composer and pianist Ola Gjeilo set this text to music in a piece called "The Lake Isle." 
Popular settings of the poem have been done by Judy Collins and the Dream Brothers. 
Australian musician Paul Kelly performs a version on his 2013 album Conversations with Ghosts.
Shusha Guppy recorded an unaccompanied version on her album This is the Day (United Artist Records, 1974).
"The Lake Isle of Innisfree" is part of the song cycle 5 Songs on Poems by W. B. Yeats composed by the Dutch composer Carolien Devilee.
A musical setting of this poem is featured in DUBLIN 1916, An Irish Oratorio and YEATS SONGS, a song cycle, both composed by Richard B. Evans (published by Seacastle Music Company, 1995).
A choral setting for treble voices by Canadian composer Eleanor Joanne Daley published by Oxford University Press.
The text was set to a choral piece for SATB and hammered dulcimer, composed by Shawn Kirchner and published by Boosey & Hawkes.

In other media
In the finale episode of the fourth season of the Fox science-fiction drama television series Fringe entitled Brave New World (Part 2), Dr. William Bell (Leonard Nimoy) narrates the first stanza of the poem, alluding to his plans of collapsing the two universes into a new world where he plays God.
In the film Million Dollar Baby, directed by Clint Eastwood, Frankie Dunn (portrayed by Eastwood) reads the first two quatrains to Margaret Fitzgerald (Hilary Swank) at the hospital after a fight where her neck has broken.
In the climactic scene from the film Three And Out, Tommy recites the poem just before he gets hit by the train.
John Ford's Academy Award winning film The Quiet Man (1952) is set in "Inisfree" and clearly takes Yeats's poem as one of its principal subtexts.
Hard rock band Sir Lord Baltimore has a song called "Lake Isle of Innersfree," presumably inspired by Yeats's poem.  It appears on their 1970 LP Kingdom Come. 
In the song "The Shrine/An Argument" by Seattle indie folk band Fleet Foxes Innisfree is mentioned in the song's final lyric: "Carry me to Innisfree like pollen on the breeze." The band also mentions Innisfree in their song "Bedouin Dress" on the same album, saying frequently: "One day at Innisfree, one day that's mine there" and "Just to be at Innisfree again".
In the song "Yeats' Grave" by Irish band The Cranberries there is a line that says "And you sit here with me, in the Isle Innisfree". 
The poem inspired Philip Gates's "The Lake Isle" for oboe and piano. 
The folksinger, songwriter, and actor Hamilton Camp released a beautiful version called "Innisfree" on his 1964 album Paths of Victory on Elektra Records. 
Composer Ola Gjeilo composed a choral song named "The Lake Isle" based on the poem.
In his debut novel Ghostwritten the British author David Mitchell quotes the first two quatrains in the chapter "London" and the last in the chapter "Clear Island."
The third book in Nicolas Freeling's Henri Castang series is Lake Isle, with explicit reference to Yeats's poem.
J. B. Priestley closes his 1932 essay "At Thurston's" by declaring that watching a billiards match at Thurston's Hall is "as near to the Isle of Innisfree as we can get within a hundred miles of Leicester Square."
South Korean cosmetic brand Innisfree takes its name from the poem.
Canadian singer-songwriter Christine Fellows mentions reading Yeats to hens in the song "The Spinster's Almanac," singing "who wouldn't like to wake up on the Isle of Innisfree/ To muck about that bee-loud glade like he?"
Scottish songwriter and musician Jackie Leven released an album titled For Peace Comes Dropping Slow (1997), Haunted Valley – reissued by Cooking Vinyl (2004). The title comes from the first line of the second quatrain.
The song "Bedouin Dress" by the American indie folk band Fleet Foxes makes several references to Innisfree. Robin Pecknold, the band's lead singer/songwriter, sings in the 2nd verse: 'And believe me it's not easy when I look back / Everything I took I'd soon return / Just to be at Innisfree again / All of the sirens are driving me over the stern / Just to be at Innisfree again." Moreover, the song includes (and concludes) with the refrain, "One day at Innisfree / One day that's mine there."

See also
1893 in poetry
List of works by William Butler Yeats

References

External links

Uninhabited islands of Ireland
Poetry by W. B. Yeats
1890 poems
Works originally published in British newspapers
Lake islands of Ireland